The men's basketball tournament at the 1983 Pan American Games was held from August 15 to August 27, 1983 in Caracas, Venezuela.

Men's competition

Participating nations

Final ranking

Awards

Women's competition

Participating nations

Final ranking

Awards

References
 Results
 basketpedya

Basketball
1991
1983–84 in North American basketball
1983–84 in South American basketball
International basketball competitions hosted by Venezuela